The Night of the Sunflowers is a 2006 rural thriller-drama film directed and written by . The cast features Carmelo Gómez, Judith Diakhate, Celso Bugallo, Manuel Morón, Mariano Alameda, Vicente Romero and Walter Vidarte. It is a Spanish-French-Portuguese co-production.

Plot 
Set in the village of Angosto, in the heart of rural Spain, the plot follows Esteban and Pedro (two speleologists) and Gabi (Esteban's girlfriend), as Cecilio, an elderly villager, is killed in the wake of a misunderstanding in the aftermath of the attempted sexual assault on Gabi by a salesman and ensuing violent confrontation.

Cast

Production 
The Night of the Sunflowers is a Spain-Portugal-France co-production. Production companies included Alta Producción, Stop Line Films, The Film SAS and Arte France Cinéma. Locations in the province of Ávila (San Bartolomé de Béjar and Becedas) doubled as the fictional village of Angosto.

Release 
The film was theatrically released in Spain on 25 August 2006. It also screened  at the Venice Days section of the 63rd Venice International Film Festival in September 2006.

Accolades

|-
| rowspan = "13" align = "center" | 2007 || rowspan = "8" | 62nd CEC Medals || colspan = "2" | Best Film ||  || rowspan = "8" | 
|-
| Best Director || Jorge Sánchez-Cabezudo || 
|-
| Best Original Screenplay || Jorge Sánchez-Cabezudo || 
|-
| Best Actor || Carmelo Gómez ||1 
|-
| Best New Artist || Jorge Sánchez-Cabezudo || 
|-
| Best Supporting Actor || Celso Bugallo || 
|-
| Best Cinematography || Ángel Iguácel || 
|-
| Best Editing || Pablo Ribeiro || 
|-
| rowspan = "3" | 21st Goya Awards || Best Original Screenplay || Jorge Sánchez-Cabezudo ||  || rowspan = "3" | 
|-
| Best New Director || Jorge Sánchez-Cabezudo || 
|-
| Best New Actor || Walter Vidarte || 
|-
| 16th Actors and Actresses Union Awards || Best Film Actor in a Minor Role || Manuel Morón ||  || align = "center" | 
|-
| 51st Sant Jordi Awards || colspan = "2" | Best Debut Film ||  || 
|}

See also 
 List of Spanish films of 2006
 List of French films of 2007

References

External links
 The Night of the Sunflowers at ICAA's Catálogo de Cinespañol
 
 
 

2006 films
Films shot in the province of Ávila
Spanish drama films
Portuguese drama films
French drama films
2000s Spanish-language films
Spanish thriller films
French thriller films
Portuguese thriller films
Films set in Spain
Rape and revenge films
2000s French films
2000s Spanish films